Fiona Hill could refer to: 

Fiona Hill (presidential advisor) (born 1965), British-American foreign affairs specialist and academic 
Fiona Hill (British political adviser) (born 1973), British political adviser and former Downing Street Chief of Staff to Theresa May